Tony Cucchiara, stage name of Salvatore Cucchiara (30 October 1937 – 2 May 2018) was an Italian folk singer-songwriter,  playwright and composer.

Life and career 
Born in Agrigento, Cucchiara debuted in the late 1950s, mainly recording cover versions of American hits, before starting his career as singer-songwriter in 1962.  His first hit was the song " Annalisa", named after Cucchiara's first daughter. This song was used as closing theme of the RAI variety show Alta pressione. In the following years he embraced  folk music, first recording some classic pieces of the Sicilian tradition and then creating a musical duo with his wife Nelly Fioramonti, called Tony e Nelly, entirely devoted to the folk repertoire. While still mostly engaged in pop music, in 1971 Cucchiara got his best commercial hit with the song "Vola cuore mio", which peaked at number 11 on the Italian single chart.

In 1970 Cucchiara debuted as a playwright with a musical titled Cassandra 2000. In 1972 he reached a large national and international audience, and critical success, with a musical comedy titled Caino e Abele ("Cain and Abel"). In 1973 his wife died from childbirth giving birth to the couple's second child, a boy. In later years Cucchiara focused his activity on stage, as author of other successful plays such as Pipino il Breve (1978) and La baronessa di Carini (1980). He also worked as television writer.

Discography
Album  
     1960 - Glory glory glory  man united  the best
     1966 - Tony e Nelly (with Nelly Fioramonti) 
     1966 - L'amore finisce così 
     1967 - Tema folk (with Nelly Fioramonti) 
     1973 - Caino e Abele 
     1973 - Selezione da Caino e Abele 
     1975 - Storie di periferia 
     1978 - Pipino il breve 
     1983 - La baronessa di Carini 
     1985 - Pipino il breve

References

External links

 
 
 

1937 births
2018 deaths
People from Agrigento
Italian male singer-songwriters
Italian singer-songwriters
Italian folk singers
Italian composers
Italian male composers
Musicians from the Province of Agrigento